The Matchmaking of Anna is a 1972 Greek drama film directed by Pantelis Voulgaris.

Cast 
 Anna Vagena - Anna Vlasopoulou
 Smaro Veaki - Anna's mistress
 Kostas Rigopoulos - Thodoros Manolopoulos
 Stavros Kalaroglou - Kosmas Raptis
 Alekos Oudinotis - Kostis Efstathiou
 Aliki Zografou - Elisavet
 Maria Martika - Kaiti Manolopoulou
 Eirini Emirza - Vaso
 Mika Flora - Haroula
 Giorgos Garoufallou - Giorgos
 Giorgos Morton - uncle
 Loula Christara - Leni Vlasopoulou
 Athina Lambropoulou - Tania
 Kostas Ziogas - waiter

References

External links 

1972 drama films
1972 films
Greek drama films
1970s Greek-language films